Emirates ( DMG: Ṭayarān Al-Imārāt) is one of two flag carriers of the United Arab Emirates (the other being Etihad). Based in Garhoud, Dubai, the airline is a subsidiary of The Emirates Group, which is owned by the government of Dubai's Investment Corporation of Dubai. , it was also the largest airline in the Middle East, operating over 3,600 flights per week from its hub at Terminal 3 of Dubai International Airport. It operates to more than 150 cities in 80 countries across all continents (except Antarctica) through its fleet of nearly 300 aircraft. Cargo activities are undertaken by Emirates SkyCargo.

Emirates is the world's fourth-largest airline by scheduled revenue passenger-kilometers flown, and the second-largest in terms of freight tonne-kilometers flown.

During the mid-1980s, Gulf Air began to cut back its services to Dubai. As a result, Emirates was conceived on 15 March 1985, with backing from Dubai's royal family, with Pakistan International Airlines giving two of the airline's first aircraft. With $10 million in start-up capital, it was required to operate independently of government subsidy. Pakistan International Airlines provided free training facilities to Emirates' cabin crew at Karachi airport. The airline was headed by Ahmed bin Saeed Al Maktoum, the airline's present chairman. In the years following its founding, the airline expanded both its fleet and its destinations. In October 2008, Emirates moved all operations at Dubai International Airport to Terminal 3.

Emirates operates a mixed fleet of Airbus and Boeing wide-body aircraft, and is one of the few airlines to operate an all-wide-body aircraft fleet (excluding Emirates Executive). , Emirates is the largest Airbus A380 operator with 119 aircraft in service, and with one aircraft having been retired. Since its introduction, the Airbus A380 has become an integral part of the Emirates fleet, especially on long-haul, high-density routes. Emirates is also the world's largest Boeing 777 operator with 134 aircraft in service. The company slogans have included "Be good to yourself and fly Emirates", "From Dubai to destinations around the world", "Fly Emirates Keep Discovering", "The finest in the sky", and "Hello Tomorrow" (also used recently); the current slogan is "Fly Emirates, Fly Better".

History 
Emirates was founded in March 1985 with backing from Dubai's ruler, Mohammed bin Rashid Al Maktoum. The airline's first flight was from Dubai to Karachi, Pakistan on October 25, 1985. Pakistan International Airlines played a large role in establishing the Emirates in its early years providing technical and administrative assistance as well as providing a new Boeing 737-300 and an Airbus A300B4-200.

During its early years, Emirates experienced strong growth, averaging 30% annually. The Gulf War helped boost business for the airline as it was the only airline to continue flying in the last ten days of the war. In 2000, the airline placed an order for a large number of aircraft, including the Boeing 777-300 and the Airbus A380, and also launched its frequent flyer program, Skywards.

Since, the airline has continued to expand its fleet and network, with a focus on connecting South Asia to North America and competing with other major airlines on international routes. Its growth has attracted criticism from other carriers, who claim that the airline has unfair advantages and have called for an end to open-skies policies with the UAE as a result. In 2017, Emirates "renewed its aircraft buying spree" and agreed to buy a number of Boeing's 787 Dreamliners for $15.1 billion. The Wall Street Journal described the deal as a "painful loss" for Airbus.

Corporate management 

The airline is a subsidiary of The Emirates Group, which itself is a subsidiary of the Dubai government's investment company, Investment Corporation of Dubai. The airline has recorded a profit every year, except its second year, and the growth has never fallen below 20% a year. In its first 11 years, it doubled in size every 3.5 years, and has every four years since.

In 2015, Emirates paid dividends worth AED2.6 billion (US$708 million), compared to AED1 billion (US$272 million) in 2014. The government has received AED14.6 billion from Emirates since dividends started being paid in 1999 for having provided an initial start-up capital of US$10 million and an additional investment of about US$80 million at the time of the airline's inception. The Dubai government is the sole owner of the company, but it does not put any new money into it, nor does it interfere with running the airline.

Structure and employment 

Emirates has diversified into related industries and sectors, including airport services, engineering, catering, and tour operator operations. Emirates has seven subsidiaries and its parent company has more than 50. At the end of the fiscal year on 31 March 2020, the company employed a total of 59,519 staff, of which 21,789 were cabin crew, 4,313 were flight deck crew, 3,316 were in engineering, 12,627 were listed as other, 5,376 employees were at overseas stations, and 12,098 were at subsidiary companies. The Emirates Group employed a total of 105,730 employees.

Emirates provides its employees with benefits such as comprehensive health plans and paid maternity and sick leave. Another strategy employed by Emirates is to use profit sharing and merit pay as part of its competency-based approach to performance management.

Environmental record 

The airline claims to have lower emissions than other airlines because its fleet has an average fuel burn of less than 4 litres for every 100 passenger–kilometers.

Fleet efficiency 

 Emirates has stated that its versions of the A380-800 will offer fuel economy of 3.1 litres per 100 passenger-kilometers.
 The company uses a program called "Flextracks". The technology is used to plan and optimize route efficiency and load factor. Passenger load factors were 81.2% in the 6 months to September 2010.
 Emirates has invested in a program called "tailored arrivals". This allows air traffic control to uplink to aircraft en route. It first determines the speed and flight profile from the air onto the runway; this allows the crew to accept and fly a continuous descent profile, saving fuel and emissions.

Financial and operational performance 

In the financial year 2019–20, Emirates generated revenues of around AED 92.0 billion ($25.1 billion), which represented a decrease around 6% over the previous year's revenues of AED 97.9 billion. Passenger numbers also decreased from 58.6 million to 56.2 million over the same period, representing a decrease around 4%. Passenger seat factor increased by 1.7% to 78.5%. Cargo carried in 2019-20 also declined, by 10% to 2.4 million tonnes (2018-19: 2.7 million tonnes). The airline's profits for the 2019/20 fiscal year rose by 21% to AED 1.1 billion ($251 million) on the back of the lower oil prices and strong US dollar, although the 45-day runway closure at Dubai International and COVID-19 pandemic negatively affected results.

Its parent company saw profits down 28% to $0.5 billion for the year to 31 March.

As of March 2020, Emirates is using fuel price hedging. Fuel was 29.1% of total costs, and employee-related costs were 13.4% of total costs.

The airline was the third-largest airline in the world in terms of international passengers carried, and the largest in the world in terms of scheduled international passenger-kilometers flown. It is also the second-largest in terms of scheduled freight tonne-kilometers flown (first in scheduled international freight tonne-kilometers flown).

Emirates' financial success has been attributed to rapid growth in demand for air travel in the Middle East, Africa, and Asia; the airline's investment in state-of-the-art aircraft; and the availability of airport capacity that can be used 24 hours a day.

As stated by Emirates' Chairman and Chief Executive Sheikh Ahmed bin Saeed Al Maktoum, passenger levels dropped by 70% in 2020. The airlines furloughed almost a quarter of its employees after witnessing losses amidst the pandemic.

Considering the dropping demand for air travel amidst the COVID-19 pandemic, Emirates is likely to witness financial issues in 2021. Per the airline's president, Emirates might have to raise cash via equity. In 2020, it took $2 billion in equity from the Dubai government.

Branding 

In the 1990s, Emirates launched its first set of commercials with the slogan "So be good to yourself, Fly Emirates". In 1999, it launched a very rare A330-200 launch commercial with different pictures showing its aircraft with the original logo and the current logo (which was launched a few months before).

Commercials have reappeared in 2002, though the airline would not adopt the slogan "Fly Emirates. Keep Discovering" until 2004. In 2008, Emirates launched a slogan mainly revolving around its route network of 100 destinations in 59+ countries across six continents – "Fly Emirates. Keep Discovering", "Fly Emirates. To over Six Continents", and "Hello Tomorrow". Emirates currently uses the slogan "Fly Better".

Emirates introduced a new design in August 2008 for its 16,000 uniformed staff, designed by Simon Jersey. The offboard uniform includes the Emirates hat, red kick-pleats in the skirts, more fitted blouses, and the return of red leather shoes and handbags. For the onboard uniform, male and female cabin crew wear service waistcoats in place of the previously worn service jackets and tabards. The male flight attendants wear a chocolate brown suit, featuring pinstripes, with a cream shirt and caramel, honey and red tie. Both male and female pursers wear this chocolate brown color, but with no red featured.

Since its formation in 1985, though to a limited extent until all were repainted, Emirates aircraft carried a section of the United Arab Emirates flag on the tail fins, a calligraphy of the logo in Arabic on the engines, and the "Emirates" logo on the fuselage both in Arabic and English. The colour scheme used since 1985 was changed in November 1999 to the one still in use today. This change had the modification of logotype, the enlargement and move of the English logo (the Arabic remaining smaller) towards the front of the aircraft, and a different, flowing flag on the tailfin.

In 2022, Emirates launched two commercials featuring a "flight attendant" standing on the spire of the Burj Khalifa. The first commercial was about the UAE moving to the UK's Amber list in the wake of the COVID-19 travel restrictions. The second commercial was to promote the Expo 2020 event with an Airbus A380, painted in a special livery, circling the woman. The woman in the videos was actually a qualified stuntwoman dressed as an Emirates flight attendant.

Sponsorship

Infrastructure 

From 2011 until 2022, Emirates sponsored the Emirates Air Line cable car over the River Thames in East London.

Since 2015, Emirates has sponsored the England-based Spinnaker Tower in Portsmouth, on the south coast. The airline did have £3.5  million worth of plans to paint the landmark red, but after some discussion with the residents of Portsmouth and Southsea, Emirates agreed the tower was to be coloured blue and gold, with red lettering of the Emirates sponsor, for the pure reason that Portsmouth F.C. (the local football team) is coloured blue and rival football team Southampton F.C. is coloured red. It is now named "Emirates Spinnaker Tower".

Cricket 

Emirates sponsors Cricket Australia, Lord's Taverners, and Pro Arch Tournament. Its branding also features on international cricket umpires shirts. Emirates has also become an official partner of the International Cricket Council till date. This deal gives Emirates association with all major ICC tournaments, including the 2011, 2015 and 2019 ICC Cricket World Cups, ICC Champions Trophy and ICC World Twenty20.

Emirates is the Twenty20 shirt sponsor of Durham County Cricket Club and hold the naming rights to the Riverside Ground, now known as Emirates Riverside, as well as the naming rights to the Emirates Old Trafford Cricket Ground, and is the shirt sponsor of Lancashire County Cricket Club. Emirates were also the major sponsor of the Kings XI Punjab (seasons two-four) and Deccan Chargers (season five) the teams of Indian Premier League, the largest domestic cricket tournament in the world.

Football 

Emirates was a sponsor of FIFA and the FIFA World Cup, but stopped its sponsorship in early 2015 because of allegations of corruption and bribery within FIFA, as well as FIFA's controversial decision to award the 2022 FIFA World Cup to Qatar.

Since the 2006–07 season, it has been the primary shirt sponsor of Arsenal, AC Milan since the 2010–11 season, Real Madrid since the 2013–14 season, Benfica since the 2015–16 season and Olympique Lyonnais since the 2020–2021 season. It is also the primary shirt sponsor of the New York Cosmos. Emirates is also the title sponsor of the FA Cup, Emirates Cup and Arsenal's Emirates Stadium. It was the primary shirt sponsor of Chelsea from August 2001 until May 2005, Paris Saint-Germain (until May 2019), and Hamburger SV until June 2020.

In August 2009 the Scottish Junior Football Association announced that Emirates would sponsor its Scottish Cup competition. Emirates is the sponsor of Asian Football Confederation travel and play, in AFC Champions League and AFF Suzuki Cup.
 Arsenal
 Arsenal WFC
 Lyon
 AC Milan
 AC Milan WFC
 Real Madrid
 Real Madrid B
 Real Madrid W
 Benfica
 Benfica B
 Benfica under-19

Rugby league

Since 2014, Emirates has been the sponsor of Super League Rugby League team, the Warrington Wolves. It is a multi-year sponsorship and the cost has been touted as around £5m.

Rugby union

Since 2015, Emirates has been also the sponsor of Super Rugby South African team the Lions, as well as having the naming rights of the team and Ellis Park rugby stadium. It is also the main sponsor of USA Rugby.

Emirates is the sponsor for the World Rugby panel of international referees.

Other sports 

In horse racing, Emirates sponsors the Dubai International Racing Carnival. It sponsored the Australian Turf Club's Autumn and Spring Carnival until 2011, and the Melbourne Cup Carnival from 2003 until 2017.

Emirates is also a regular sponsor of the equestrian sport showjumping, notably at events in Dubai with the CSI5* Emirates Airline Dubai Grand Prix, and with the Longines Masters series, which currently runs CSI5* competitions in Hong Kong, Paris, and New York (formerly held in Los Angeles).

Emirates is one of the main sponsors of the Australian and the French Opens at the start of the 2021 season after returning from the first signed the contract in 2016.

Emirates is the major sponsor of the Emirates Team New Zealand, winners of the 35th America's Cup in sailing.

Emirates was a sponsor of the British Formula One (F1) team McLaren in the 2006 season. It was also the official airline sponsor of Formula One from the 2013 season until the 2022 season. It was outbid by rival Qatar Airways for the 2023 season.

Since the 2012 season, Emirates has sponsored the US Open Series, a six-week summer tennis season leading up to the US Open. Its sponsorship was to run until 2019.

Emirates also sponsors Collingwood Football Club in the Australian Football League, and FC Dallas in Major League Soccer.

Since the 2016 season, Emirates is the official airline of the Los Angeles Dodgers of Major League Baseball.

Since 2017, Emirates has been the sponsor of the UAE Team Emirates (former Team Lampre-Mérida), which is a UCI World Tour Cycling Team. Being World Tour, the team obtains automatic entry to the Tour de France, Giro d'Italia, and Vuelta a Espana, as well as all the major one-day races.

Spokesperson 

Since 2015, Jennifer Aniston has starred in two commercials for the company.

Expo 2020 
Emirates became one of the official premier partners of the Expo 2020 event hosted by Dubai. To commemorate the event, Emirates unveiled a special livery in three colours (orange, green, and blue) to represent the three themes of the event, namely, Opportunity, Sustainability, and Mobility, respectively. One of its A380s was painted in a blue, nose-to-tail livery that said, "Join The Making of a New World". The sponsorship lasted from October 1, 2021 till the event's closure on 31 March 2022.

Destinations 

In May 2015, Emirates operated over 3,000 flights every week across its network of over 150 destinations in over 70 countries across six continents from its hub in Dubai. Prior to suspensions due to the COVID-19 pandemic in March 2020, Emirates' global network spanned 157 destinations in 83 countries.

Alliance 

Emirates has collaborated with other airlines, but is not a member of any of the three global airline alliances – Oneworld, SkyTeam, or Star Alliance. In 2000, the airline briefly considered joining Star Alliance, but opted to remain independent. The reasoning for this was later revealed by senior vice president of the airline's commercial operations worldwide that, "Your ability to react in the marketplace is hindered because you need a consensus from your alliance partners".

Codeshare agreements 

Emirates codeshares with these airlines:

 Air Canada
 Air Malta
 Air Mauritius
 airBaltic
 Airlink
 Azul Brazilian Airlines
 Bangkok Airways
 Batik Air
 China Southern Airlines
 Copa Airlines
 flydubai
 Garuda Indonesia
 Gol Linhas Aéreas Inteligentes
 Gulf Air
 Japan Airlines
 Jetstar
 Jetstar Asia Airways
 Korean Air
 LATAM Brasil
 Malaysia Airlines
 Philippine Airlines
 Qantas
 Royal Air Maroc
 S7 Airlines
 SNCF (railway)
 SpiceJet
 TAP Air Portugal
 Thai Airways
 Trenitalia (railway)
 Tunisair
 Uganda Airlines
 United Airlines
 WestJet

Divisions

Emirates SkyCargo 

Emirates SkyCargo is the air freight division of Emirates. It began operations in October 1985, the same year Emirates was formed, and launched its own aircraft services in 2001 with a Boeing 747 Freighter. It serves 10 exclusive cargo destinations, besides others in common with the Emirates passenger network. As of June 2019 it operated 11 Boeing 777 Freighters. During the 2020 pandemic, SkyCargo also began to operate 777-300ER and A380 passenger aircraft as preighters to expand their total cargo capacity.

Emirates Executive 

Emirates Executive was launched in 2013 for corporate and private charters. It operates a single Airbus ACJ319 business jet, accommodating 19 people. It features a mix of private suites and seating, a lounge, dining area, and bathrooms with full-height showers.

Fleet 

As of January 2022, Emirates operates a fleet of 254 passenger aircraft and 10 cargo aircraft operated by Emirates SkyCargo. Emirates operates the largest fleet of both the Airbus A380 and Boeing 777 aircraft in the world, with one A319 as an executive jet. Emirates has had no narrow-body aircraft in its mainline fleet since 1995.

In July 2014, Emirates finalized an order for 150 Boeing 777X aircraft (this number later reduced, see below), consisting of 35 777-8s and 115 777-9s, and, was expected to become the launch operator for the 777X in mid-2020. In November 2017, it signed a commitment for 40 787-10s, but by early 2019, it was considering cancelling this order because engine margins were insufficient for the hot Dubai weather, in favour of the A350.

In February 2019, Emirates signed a memorandum of understanding with Airbus for 40 A330-900s and 30 A350-900s, while reducing its total A380 order to eight (with the last one to be delivered in 2022) after which Airbus will cease production of the A380. Emirates received the final A380 built by Airbus on December 16, 2021. It was the 123rd A380 to join the fleet. The delivery officially closing the Airbus A380 production 14 years after the first delivery to Singapore Airlines in 2007.

In November 2019, Emirates announced an order of 50 A350-900s worth US$16 billion that superseded the February memorandum of understanding. Also in November 2019, Emirates placed an order for 30 Boeing 787-9 Dreamliners for a value of US$8.8 billion with deliveries to commence in 2023, while reducing its order of 777Xs from 150 to 126.

In December, Emirates reduced further 777X orders from 126 to 115. Being the largest operator of the A380, Emirates maintains its fleet via the MRO subsidiary of Safran, OEMServices.

Livery

First Emirates livery (1985–2005) 
The 1st livery of Emirates, created by Negus & Negus, was similar to the second livery, except that the company name "Emirates" was written in a different font; it was relatively smaller, located on the top of the windows; and it was followed by the company name in Arabic. All aircraft wearing the 1st generation livery were either repainted or retired. This livery was retired by 2005 as the last aircraft with the 1st generation livery (an Airbus A310-300) was repainted to the 2nd generation livery.

Second Emirates livery (1999–2023) 
The 2nd Emirates livery, which featured a UAE flag on the vertical stabilizer and a white fuselage, with the golden word "Emirates" painted on the upper fuselage, was introduced in November 1999 on the Boeing 777-300 and on all Airbus A330/A340 aircraft that were delivered from November 1999. The livery rolled out shortly after in 2000 on the rest of the Emirates fleet, and Emirates repainted all aircraft to this livery by 2005. The 2nd Emirates livery also kept the Arabic company name, but the font size is smaller than the one from the 1st Emirates livery. The Emirates logo in Arabic is painted gold on all engines.

Current Emirates livery (2023-present) 
On 16th March 2023, Emirates revealed their new livery. Sir Tim Clark, President of Emirates Airline said: “Aircraft livery is the most instantly recognisable brand real estate for any airline. It’s a visual representation of our unique identity, something we wear proudly, and display in all the cities we fly to around the world. We’re refreshing our livery to keep it modern, without losing the key elements of our identity such as the UAE flag on our tailfin and the Arabic calligraphy.”

Eagle-eyed plane spotters and fans will immediately notice changes to the tailfin and wingtips. In this latest design, the UAE flag on the Emirates tailfin is much more dynamic and flowing with a 3D effect artwork, and the wingtips have been painted red with the Emirates logo in Arabic calligraphy “popping” out in reverse white. Passengers onboard with a window view will see the UAE flag colours painted on the wingtips facing the fuselage. The word Emirates will be in gold colour and 32.5% larger than the previous one.
The new livery will be gradually applied across the rest of the existing Emirates fleet with 24 aircraft, including 17 Boeing 777s, expected to sport the refreshed livery by the end of 2023.  All new Emirates aircraft, from the first Airbus A350 entering the fleet in August 2024 will be delivered in this new livery.

Services

Cabin 

 First class

The two types of first class seating are the fully enclosed suite with a floor-to-ceiling door and a private suite with doors that close, but do not extend to the ceiling. Both suites come complete with closing doors to ensure privacy, a minibar, a coat rack, and storage. The seat converts into a  fully flat bed. Private suites are available on three-class Airbus A380-800 and three-class Boeing 777-300ER aircraft. The fully enclosed suites are available on its newly delivered Boeing 777-300ER aircraft.

On its newly delivered Airbus A380-800, first class features private suites, two shower-equipped lavatories and spa, and access to the first/business class bar area and lounge. Premium class seating is located on the entire upper deck of A380-800 aircraft.

Emirates introduced a new first-class cabin for its Boeing 777-300ER fleet on 12 November 2017 and first flight to Brussels and Geneva on 1 December 2017. The new first-class cabin is configured with six suites on a 1-1-1 layout. The middle suites come with virtual windows that project live feed from the outside of the aircraft on real time. Both the middle suites are equipped with three virtual windows, which are high-definition LCD screens that relay real-time images using HD cameras on either side of the aircraft. Amenities include two minibars placed on either side of the entertainment screen, a 13-inch tablet with a front camera to communicate with the cabin crew and to order room service, and a panel to control the lighting and temperature inside the suite. Emirates has also introduced a new seat in collaboration with Mercedes-Benz, which features a new zero-gravity position. The suites are expected to resemble "a private bedroom on a luxury yacht".

 Business class

Amenities include massage function, privacy partition, winged headrest with six-way movement, two individual reading lights, and an overhead light per seat; in-seat power supply, USB ports, and an RCA socket for laptop connection; and over 600 channels of entertainment on ICE, shown on a  HD TV screen.

On Airbus A380-800 aircraft, the seats recline to form a fully flat bed and are equipped with personal minibars. Business class passengers also have access to an on-board bar at the rear of the aircraft.

 

Currently, only six Airbus A380 aircraft in Emirates' fleet have a premium economy class; the cabin is also set to be introduced alongside the delivery of Emirates' first Boeing 777X (around 2025). These seats are also set to be fitted on the airline's Boeing 777-300ERs. As of December 2020, it has now been officially announced by Tim Clark, Emirates CEO, that the premium economy cabins will be equipped with the Recaro PL3530 seats. Emirates has also introduced a new retrofit program scheduled to begin at the end of 2022; by the end of the program, 52 Airbus A380s and 53 Boeing 777s will be fitted with premium economy.
 Economy class

Emirates has 10 seats per row on its Boeing 777 fleet. The seat features adjustable headrests, a 3000-channel ICE in-flight entertainment system, and in-seat laptop power outlets on newer aircraft and laptop recharging facilities in galleys in older aircraft. Additional recline is used on A380 economy-class seats.

Catering 

Catering on Emirates flights from Dubai International is provided by Emirates Flight Catering, which operates one of the largest airline catering facilities in the world. Emirates also offers special meal options, in all classes, based on age, dietary restrictions and preference, and religious observance. Special meals must be ordered in advance, at least 24 hours before the flight departure time. All meals, however, are prepared according to Halal dietary guidelines. In June 2018, Emirates signed a $40 million joint venture with Oakland, California-based Crop One Holdings, to build and maintain the world's largest hydroponic growing facility. It will provide daily yields of roughly 3 tons of leafy greens per day to all flights, with a near 150,000 square foot indoor, vertical farm.

In-flight entertainment system 

Emirates became one of the first group of airlines in the world to introduce a personal entertainment system on a commercial aircraft in 1992, with Virgin Atlantic introducing a similar system throughout the cabins of its aircraft. All three classes feature a personal in-flight entertainment (IFE) system on Emirates aircraft. There are two types of entertainment system on Emirates: ICE and ICE Digital Widescreen.

In 2012, Emirates introduced larger high-definition IFE screens in all classes. The new IFE is the first to be fully high definition, and in economy, the screens are the largest offered by any airline. The new IFE will only be installed on the Airbus A380 fleet and the newly delivered Boeing 777s.

ICE 

ICE (information, communication, entertainment) is the in-flight entertainment system operated by Emirates.

Introduced in 2003, ICE is available on all new aircraft and now features 4,000 channels (on most flights) to all passengers. ICE is found on the airline's Airbus A380-800, Boeing 777-200LR and Boeing 777-300ER.

In July 2007, Emirates introduced ICE Digital Widescreen, an updated version of ICE. It offered over 1200 channels of selected entertainment available to all passengers. ICE Digital Widescreen is available on all new aircraft.

In 2015, Emirates upgraded its ICE system to the new eX3 system, which includes new upgrades that improved passenger experience, such as handset with more controls, larger screens, new sockets, some 3,500 channels of movies, TV shows, music, and games, on demand and in multiple languages, new ICE features, such as a Voyager app, Bluetooth audio, and personal video playback. This is fitted in 2009 onward aircraft B777 and A380, as well as installed on new aircraft that will be delivered to the airline.

According to Emirates, ICE has received more awards than any other airline in the world for inflight entertainment.

 Information

The system is based on the 3000i system from Panasonic Avionics Corporation. ICE provides passengers with a direct data link to BBC News. ICE is the first IFE system to be connected directly to automatic news updates. This is complemented by ICE's Airshow moving-map software from Rockwell Collins. Exterior cameras located on the aircraft can be viewed by any passenger, through the IFE system, during takeoff, cruise, and landing. Emirates was also one of the first airlines to introduce high-speed, in-flight internet service along with Singapore Airlines, by installing the Inmarsat's satellite system and became the second airline in the world to offer live international television broadcasts using the same system.

 Communication

ICE has a link to an in-flight email server, which allows passengers to access, send, or receive emails for US$1 per message. ICE also supports a seat-to-seat chat service. In November 2006, the airline signed a deal with mobile communications firm AeroMobile to allow in-flight use of mobile phones to call or text people on the ground. The service was first introduced in March 2008.

 Entertainment

The ICE system includes movies, music, and video games. ICE offers over 600 on-demand movie titles, over 2000 video on demand and prerecorded television channels, over 1000 hours of music, and over 100 video-game titles. ICE can be accessed in more than 40 languages, including English, French, German, Russian, Spanish, Arabic, Chinese, Hindi, Urdu, Persian, Korean, Tamil, Thai, Dutch, Swedish, Italian, and Japanese. Since 2003, all entertainment options are available on demand to all classes with options to pause, forward, and rewind them.

Emirates began to offer docking capability for Apple Inc.'s iPod portable music and video player in mid-2007. This allows the device's battery to be charged, and integrates with Emirates' in-flight entertainment (IFE) system. The IFE system can play music, television shows, or movies stored on the iPod, and function as a control system.

Ground services 

Passengers may check in between 2 and 24 hours prior to departure at Dubai International Airport, as well as at certain stations of the Dubai Metro. All Emirates flights are now operated exclusively from Terminal 3 at Dubai International Airport.

Lounges 

First- and business-class passengers and Skywards Platinum and Gold members have access to 33 Emirates lounges in 32 cities. Skywards Silver members can use the lounges at Dubai Airport only. At airports in which Emirates does not operate a departure lounge, a third-party departure lounge is usually provided for first- and business-class passengers and Skywards Platinum and Gold members.

Chauffeur-drive 

Complimentary chauffeur-driven airport transfers are available to business- and first-class passengers in over 75 cities to airports.

In Dubai, Emirates uses the new BMW 5 Series Touring car for business-class passengers, and the Mercedes-Benz S-Class sedan for first-class passengers.

In other countries, the type of vehicle varies depending on the location and service provider that the airline has contracted.

Frequent-flyer program 

Emirates Skywards is the frequent-flyer program of Emirates launched in 2000. The program had over 16 million members as of 2016. The program uses two separate points systems – Skywards Miles as the currency that can be redeemed for benefits, and Tier Miles as the metric that determines a member's tier status.

The four tiers are  Blue, Silver, Gold, and Platinum. Every new customer becomes a Blue member upon registration, which is free of charge. Silver tier requires 25,000 Tier Miles, Gold tier requires 50,000 Tier Miles, and Platinum tier requires 150,000 Tier Miles for qualification, respectively.

Emirates Skywards has partners across airlines, banks, hotels, car rentals, and retail/lifestyle verticals.

As of 2016, Emirates has frequent-flyer partnerships with Alaska Airlines, easyJet, Japan Airlines, Jet Airways, JetBlue, Jetstar, Korean Air, Malaysia Airlines, Qantas, S7 Airlines, South African Airways, TAP Portugal, Virgin America, Air Mauritius, and GOL.

Emirates Skywards has partnered with Starwood Preferred Guest (also known as SPG, the loyalty program of Starwood Hotels and Resorts) to bring its members Your World Rewards. This allows Emirates Skywards members to earn both Skywards Miles and Starpoints (the loyalty currency for SPG program) when they either fly with Emirates to over 150 destinations or stay at any of SPG's 1,200 Starwood Hotels and Resorts.

Another noteworthy partnership is Emirates Skywards partnership with Dubai Duty Free (DDF), which was launched in 2016. This partnership allows members to spend their Skywards Miles at participating DDF outlets when they travel through Dubai airports. Members can redeem their Skywards Miles for duty-free products at Dubai International airport and Al Maktoum International at Dubai South. Redemptions start from 4,500 Skywards Miles (worth AED 100), and members can instantly redeem Skywards Miles at the checkout. Each additional Dirham (AED) is equivalent to 45 Skywards Miles, with no upper limit to the number of Skywards Miles that can be spent.

From 28 August 2016, Emirates Skywards enabled its members to use miles or a combination of cash and miles (Cash+Miles) to pay for an EK published fare as a form of payment.

This benefit allows members to redeem a minimum of 2000 Skywards Miles and a maximum of total amount of base fare in Skywards Miles. Cash + miles is used as a form of payment for the base fare only and excludes taxes and carrier-imposed charges. This benefit is available on Emirates flights only and not available on any other airlines with which Emirates has a codeshare agreement.

Cash+Miles offers Emirates Skywards members more choice and flexibility when it comes to spending their Skywards Miles. This is available in all classes and is applicable to all fare types.

Business model 

The established network carriers in Europe and Australia, i.e. Air France-KLM, British Airways, Lufthansa, and Qantas, perceive Emirates' strategic decision to reposition itself as a global carrier as a major threat because it enables air travelers to bypass traditional airline hubs such as London-Heathrow, Paris-CDG, and Frankfurt on their way between Europe/North America and Asia/Australia by changing flights in Dubai, instead. These carriers also find it difficult to deal with the growing competitive threat Emirates poses to their business because of their much higher cost base.

Some of these carriers, notably Air France and Qantas, have accused Emirates of receiving hidden state subsidies and of maintaining too cozy a relationship with Dubai's airport authority and its aviation authority, both of which are also wholly state-owned entities that share the same government owner with the airline. Qantas' chairman claimed that Emirates can reduce its borrowing costs below market rates by taking advantage of its government shareholders' sovereign borrower status. Emirates' president disagrees and has also referred to United States airlines bankruptcy protection as being a tangible form of state assistance. The airline makes regular profits. In 2016, American Airlines, Delta Airlines, and United Airlines made similar claims, as well as stating that Emirates violates Open Skies, but these conflicts were resolved in May 2018.

In May 2010, Emirates executives refuted claims that the carrier does not pay taxes and receives substantial financial assistance from the Dubai government. They claimed that the airline received $80m in cash and kind in the 25 years since the airline was established and this was substantially lower than what other national carriers had received. Maurice Flanagan also claimed that Emirates incurred social costs of around $600m in 2009 and this included municipal taxes to the city of Dubai. The airline also paid a dividend of AED956m ($260m) in 2010, compared to AED2.9bn ($793m) in 2009, and each year the Government has received at least $100m in dividends.

Emirates also faces competition from other Middle Eastern airlines, mainly Qatar Airways and Abu Dhabi–based Etihad Airways.

On 15 June 2021, Emirates announced a loss of $5.5 billion over the year 2020-21 as revenue fell by more than 66% because of global travel restrictions sparked by the coronavirus pandemic. In more than three decades, this marks the first time that the Dubai-based airline's parent group has not churned out a profit.

Accidents and incidents 

Emirates has experienced several aircraft incidents (none with passenger or crew fatalities).

 On 9 April 2004, Emirates Flight 764, an Airbus A340-300 operating from Johannesburg to Dubai, sustained serious damage during takeoff when it overran runway 03L, striking runway 21R approach lights, causing four tires to burst, which threw debris into various parts of the aircraft, ultimately damaging the flap drive mechanism. This rendered the flaps immovable in the takeoff position. The aircraft returned for an emergency landing during which the normal braking system failed as a result of the damage. The aircraft was brought to a stop only  from the end of the  runway using reverse thrust and the alternative braking system. In their report, South African investigators found that the captain had used a wrong take-off technique, and criticized Emirates training and rostering practices.
 On 20 March 2009, Emirates Flight 407, an Airbus A340-500 registered A6-ERG en route from Melbourne to Dubai, failed to take off properly at Melbourne Airport, hitting several structures at the end of the runway before eventually climbing enough to return to the airport for a safe landing. There were no injuries, but the incident was severe enough to be classified as an accident by the Australian Transport Safety Bureau.
 On 3 August 2016, Emirates Flight 521, a Boeing 777-300 registered A6-EMW arriving from Trivandrum International Airport, crash-landed and caught fire at Dubai International Airport at 12:44 pm local time. All 282 passengers and 18 crew on board survived the impact with some having minor injuries. However, an airport firefighter died fighting the blaze. The aircraft was destroyed by the fire. Flight 521 is currently the first and only hull loss in the history of Emirates.
 On 13 April 2020, an Emirates Boeing 777-300ER registered as A6-EBR collided with a taxiing British Airways Airbus A350 at Dubai International Airport. No casualties were reported and both the aircraft suffered minimal damage.
 On 20 December 2021, Emirates Flight 231, a Boeing 777-300ER registered as A6-EQI departed Dubai International Airport towards Washington Dulles. The aircraft nearly overran the runway during takeoff, flying at only  over houses located near the airport. The aircraft was not damaged and there were no injuries. The incident remains under investigation.

Controversy

Emirates has received criticism for their treatment of staff, which Emirates has disputed.

See also 

 Etihad Airways
 Dubai International Airport
 Emirates Flight Training Academy
 List of airlines of the United Arab Emirates
 List of airports in the United Arab Emirates

Footnotes

Notes 

 Emirates moved its operations to its dedicated Terminal 3 at Dubai International Airport on 14 October 2008.
 The number of destinations does not include cargo-only destinations.
 The Emirates Group does not publish figures separately for Emirates SkyCargo or Emirates, both companies' financial results are aggregated.

References 

 Emirates profile on Dhow Net

Bibliography 

  (The Economist online)
  (Financial Times online)
  (Financial Times online)
  (The Sunday Times online)
  (Flight International online)

Further reading 

  (Airliner World online)

External links 

 
 Emirates Parent Company
 Emirates Annual Reports
 Emirates News releases
 Emirates SkyCargo

 
The Emirates Group
Airlines of the United Arab Emirates
Arab Air Carriers Organization members
Airlines established in 1985
Companies based in Dubai
Emirati brands
Government-owned airlines
Government-owned companies of the United Arab Emirates
Emirati companies established in 1985